The Chicago mayoral election of 1987 was first the primary election on February 24, 1987 followed by the general election on April 7, 1987. The election saw the re-election of Chicago, Illinois' first African-American mayor, Harold Washington. Ed Vrdolyak, the leader of the Vrdolyak 29, unsuccessfully opposed him, running on the  Illinois Solidarity Party ticket. Former mayor Jane Byrne, who served from 1979 until 1983 unsuccessfully challenged Washington in the Democratic primary.

Primaries and nominations

Democratic primary
Despite having, at one point, considered running for reelection as an independent (thus forgoing a primary), incumbent Democrat Harold Washington ultimately ran for re-nomination. This came counter to expectations, which had widely been that he would follow-through on plans run as an independent.

Four years earlier Washington had won nomination against divided opposition, and in 1987 faced a more united bloc of opponents. Nevertheless, Washington won the Democratic primary. Former Mayor Jane Byrne challenged Washington in the Democratic primary for mayor. He had unseated her in the previous Democratic primary. Richard M. Daley, who (along with Byrne) had been one of Washington's chief opponents in the 1983 primary threw his support behind Washington.

Washington did not attend any debates. Byrne's campaign ads argued that, under Washington's tenure, racial tensions in Chicago had increased. Byrne's strategy aimed to limit Washington's share of the white vote to a maximum of 10%, while managing to capture 10% of the black vote for herself. Post-election polling indicated that Washington received 96% of the black vote (a greater share than he had received four years earlier). Polling also indicated that he received 21% of the white vote (more than twice what he had received four years earlier). Surveys also indicated that turnout in heavily-black precincts had increased since the last election, whilst turnout in heavily-white precincts had experienced a small decline.

Washington's victory made 1987 the first Chicago mayoral race since 1975 Chicago mayoral election in which the incumbent mayor won the primary. Also running was Sheila A. Jones. Cook County Accessor Thomas Hynes had originally been running for the Democratic nomination. However, on January 7 he dropped out of the primary. One January 13 he declared that he intended to instead run as the nominee of the "Chicago First" party, a party which he himself had just founded.

Polls

Results
Turnout was 75.68%.

Washington received 96% of the African-American vote, surpassing the 80% in the 1983 election. Washington received 25% of the white vote, rising from 17% he received in 1983.

|- bgcolor="#E9E9E9" align="center"
! colspan="5" rowspan="1" align="center" |Chicago Democratic Party Mayoral Primary, 1987
|- bgcolor="#E9E9E9" align="center"
! colspan="2" rowspan="1" align="left" | Candidate
! width="75" | Votes
! width="30" | %
! width="45" | +/-
|-
| bgcolor="#3333FF" |
| align="left" | Harold Washington (incumbent)
|   
| %
| +17.22%
|-
| bgcolor="#3333FF" |
| align="left" | Jane Byrne
|   
| %
| +12.63%
|-
| bgcolor="#3333FF" |
| align="left" | Sheila Jones
| 
| %
| +0.12%
|-
| colspan="2" align="left" | Majority
|   
| % 
| +2.64%
|-
| colspan="2" align="left" | Total
|  || % 
| N/A
|-
|}

Republican primary
At one point it was believed that, if a federal bribery investigation against members of City Hall (including some in Washington's administration) had proved damaging enough to Washington, he might face a particularly notable Republican opponent such as Richard B. Ogilvie or Dan K. Webb (the latter of whom had been involved in launching the aforementioned bribery probe). This did not come into fruition. However, what did come to fruition was simultaneous speculation that Democrats may bolt from their party and challenge Washington as a Republican.

The Republican Party nominated Donald H. Haider, a business professor and former city budget director. Haider was formerly a Democrat. The fifth overall mayoral candidate to be a resident of Edgewater, Haider would have been the third mayor from Edgewater if he were elected (and the first since Martin H. Kennelly). Haider was endorsed by the city's Republican Party organization on December 4, 1986. He had narrowly defeated 1983 nominee Bernard Epton for the endorsement. However, despite the party endorsing Haider, Epton and Democratic state senator Jeremiah E. Joyce indicated their intentions to challenge Haider in the Republican primary. Neither ultimately ran. Instead, he was challenged by Kenneth Hurst,  Chester Hornowski, and Ray Wardingley.

Kenneth Hurst was the 39th Ward Republican committeeman and was also running for alderman in that ward. A self-described Reagan Republican, he ran for mayor on a wide number of social issues. Hurst opposed the Equal Rights Amendment and a gay rights ordinance by the City Council. He also opposed publicly subsidized abortions and the distribution of contraceptives in clinics at public schools.

Chester Hornowski was the 35th Ward Republican committeeman, as well as a police officer. He focused his time more heavily on his coinciding aldermanic campaign, admitting he had little prospect of becoming mayor. He ran for mayor on a "law and order" platform, also pledging to end tax hikes and improve the city's schools. Ray Wardingley, an entertainer who performed as a clown under the name "Spanky the Clown", had run for mayor twice before. He promoted himself as the candidate representing "the little guy"

Results

Haider won the primary.

Illinois Solidarity nomination
Vrdolyak formally received the Illinois Solidarity nomination on February 24.

Independents and other third-party candidates
Independent candidate Ronald D. Bartos saw his name removed from the ballot due to issues with his petition.

"Chicago First" nominee Thomas Hynes withdrew two days before the election and threw his support behind Washington's two remaining opponents.

General election

Campaign

Some regarded Washington's modest margin of victory in the Democratic primary as an indicator that he would be vulnerable in the general election.

Initially, Chicago First nominee Hynes polled well. He claimed he was a fresh alternative to the dirty infighting that had defined Chicago politics in recent years. Hynes also talked about being the issue-oriented candidate as opposed to some of the other candidates who allegedly talked about each other. As the election drew close, voters opposed to Mayor Washington rallied behind Vrdolyak, Washington's most fiery opponent. Hynes' support waned. Just two days before the general election, Hynes dropped out, leaving Vrdolyak and Haider as Washington's remaining opponents. Hynes did not throw his support to any of the remaining candidates, but suggested that either Vrdolyak or Haider should also drop out make it a one-on-one race against Washington.

During the campaign, in a desperate bid for press, Republican nominee Haider rode an elephant (an animal often used to symbolize the Republican Party) down State Street.

Civil rights activist Coretta Scott King, widow of Martin Luther King Jr., campaigned for Washington in predominately African-American neighborhoods throughout the city, most notably at the city's public housing complexes.

Results

Washington won a plurality of the vote in 27 of Chicago's 50 wards (winning a majority in 25 of those wards). Vrdolyak won a plurality in 23 wards (winning a majority in 20 of those wards).

Results by ward

References

1987
Chicago
1987 Illinois elections
1980s in Chicago
1987 in Illinois